Yoshihide Ueda (born 6 December 1926) is a Japanese sport shooter who competed in the 1956 Summer Olympics.

References

External links
 

1926 births
Possibly living people
Japanese male sport shooters
ISSF pistol shooters
Olympic shooters of Japan
Shooters at the 1956 Summer Olympics